Ivan Yakovlevich Mosyakin (1 July 1947 – 4 June 2022) was a Russian politician. A member of Our Home – Russia and later United Russia, he served in the State Duma from 2003 to 2007.

He died in Oryol on 4 June 2022 at the age of 74.

References

1947 births
2022 deaths
United Russia politicians
Fourth convocation members of the State Duma (Russian Federation)
Recipients of the Order "For Merit to the Fatherland", 4th class
Recipients of the Order of Honour (Russia)
People from Oryol Oblast